The Autopista Radial R-4 is a Spanish radial motorway originating from Madrid and passing through Valdemoro, connecting to the N-400, Autovía A-40 and Autopista AP-36.

The road is managed by Spanish Operator Cintra.

External links
 http://www.radial4.com/

Autopistas and autovías in Spain
Transport in Madrid